Black Widows is a ZEE5 original dark comedy Indian web series directed by Birsa Dasgupta and produced by Namit Sharma. The series is a remake of the popular 2014 Finnish show, Mustat Lesket. Starring Mona Singh, Swastika Mukherjee, Shamita Shetty, Sharad Kelkar, Mohan Kapur, Parambrata Chattopadhyay, Vipul Roy, Sabyasachi Chakraborty, Aamir Ali and Raima Sen, the series released through ZEE5 on 18 December 2020.

Plot 
The premise revolves around Veera (Mona Singh), Jayati (Swastika Mukherjee) and Kavita (Shamita Shetty) who plan to get rid of their husbands to end the misery in their wed-locked lives.

Cast 
 Mona Singh as Veera Mehrotra
 Swastika Mukherjee as Jayati Sardesai
 Shamita Shetty as Kavita Tharoor
 Sharad Kelkar as Jatin Mehrotra
 Parambrata Chattopadhyay as Inspector Pankaj Mishra
 Sabyasachi Chakraborty as Barry Singh Dhillon
 Mohan Kapur as Lalit
 Aamir Ali as Eddie
 Raima Sen as Innaya Thakur
 Saheb Chatterjee as Rameez Sheikh
 Nikhil Bhambri as Jahaan Sardesai
 Mithu Chakraborty as Rameez's mother
 Mainak Banerjee as a Constable
 Rupsha Chatterjee as Jatin's Secretary

Release 
Black Widows premiered through ZEE5 on 18 December 2020

Reception 
Archika Khurana from Times Of India stated "Swastika Mukherjee steals the show as the strong-headed yet emotionally smothered Jayati and overall praised the plot of the series."Hindustan Times wrote "An enthralling murder mystery with a dash of dark humour" at  the same time praised the performances of the entire cast  News 18 summed their review as "Too Much Hamming Ruins This Otherwise Average Mystery"  Scroll.in summed their review stating that the cast gave a balanced performance, at the same time dissected each characters. The Quint'' stated "Black Widows is a terrific Dark Comedy that keeps you hooked"

Accolades

References

External links 
 
 Black Widows on ZEE5

2020 web series debuts
Indian web series
Hindi-language web series
ZEE5 original programming